Tor Hamer (born January 20, 1983) is an American former professional boxer who competed from 2008 to 2013. As an amateur, he won the 2008 National Golden Gloves at super heavyweight.

Early life
Raised in Harlem as well as suburban Baltimore, he attended private and charter schools until attending Penn State for his B.A. He has a Harvard-educated father and a Villanova-educated mother, both of whom work in education.

Amateur career
Hamer was trained at Gleason's Gym. At the National Championships, he narrowly lost to southpaw and eventual winner Lenroy Thompson. He later beat him in the Golden Gloves quarterfinals to avenge his only loss. His amateur record was 34-1.

Professional career
After his Golden Gloves victory in May 2008, Hamer was approached by boxing's premier promoters: Oscar De La Hoya, Don King and Lou DiBella, ultimately signing with DiBella Entertainment.

He made his professional debut on October 22, 2008, defeating Joseph Rabotte via second-round TKO. He suffered his first loss, on points, to undefeated Kelvin Price. In June 2012 he won the second edition of the Prizefighter International Heavyweights, which took place in London. After beating Marcelo Luiz Nascimento by unanimous decision and knocking out Tom Dallas (15-2) in 29 seconds, he beat the pre-tournament betting favorite Kevin Johnson (26-1) in the final. Later, however, he lost against Vyacheslav Glazkov and Andy Ruiz by way of forfeit on both occasions.

References

External links
Team USA profile

Living people
1983 births
African-American boxers
Pennsylvania State University alumni
Heavyweight boxers
National Golden Gloves champions
American male boxers
Boxers from New York City
21st-century African-American sportspeople
20th-century African-American people